Disability Labour is a socialist society associated with the UK Labour Party. Disability Labour seeks to represent and support disabled Labour members and supporters. They are an independent policy-making group on disability with further "aims to support and develop disabled party members to serve as policymakers, ministers and elected officials".

Membership 
Group membership is free to disabled Labour members and their carers.

Individual, CLP, and trade union affiliation is offered with Unison an example of a trade union affiliate to Disability Labour.

History

2015 
In 2015, Disability Labour was relaunched - announced in the 2015 Labour Party conference.

2018 
In 2018 the executive committee of Disability Labour was widely replaced with members from the Disability Equality Act Labour (DEAL) campaign group after tensions over the previous executive committee.

The same year also saw the co-chair Fran Springfield criticising the UK's Department for Work and Pensions endorsement of Purple Tuesday, a day aimed for accessible shopping, that saw massive marketing campaigns from UK brands towards disabled people. Springfield outlined: "this is a disgraceful attempt to 'sell out' disabled people to commercial entities. Every day should be an accessible shopping day! Disability Labour are deeply concerned that the DWP, which harasses and persecutes disabled people on a daily basis, will use video footage to identify if claimants are shopping, what they’re purchasing and even how far they are walking".

See also 
 Disability Rights UK

References

External links

Disability Labour on Facebook
Disability Labour on Twitter

Disability rights organizations
Labour Party (UK) socialist societies